Evergreen International Aviation, Inc. was a global aviation services company based in McMinnville, Oregon, United States. Founded in 1960, Evergreen was primarily known publicly for commercial helicopter operations in agricultural and forestry applications.

The airline division, Evergreen International Airlines, operated worldwide, in 168 countries, and by the end had been reduced to a fleet of all-cargo Boeing 747 freighters. The company also operated a helicopter division, Evergreen Helicopters which was sold to Erickson Air-Crane, an Oregon-based helicopter operator, for $250 million in 2013.  Faced with bankruptcy and tax investigations, Evergreen ceased all aviation-related operations in 2013 and shut down in 2014.

History

Delford M. Smith founded the company as Evergreen Helicopters in 1960. Smith was involved in the development of the commercial use of helicopters, and his company was one of the first to use helicopters for spraying fertilizer and herbicides, spreading seeds and fighting forest fires. Smith helped develop a helicopter spray system called the "PaceSpreader" which permitted accurate, fast delivery of granular agents over large areas.  The PaceSpreader allowed the helicopter to operate at relatively high speeds while still delivering the product evenly and with measured precision. In 1972 the company expanded into the use of heavy lift helicopters, acquiring a number of Sikorsky S-61. In March 1973 the massive Sikorsky S-64 Skycrane was added to the fleet, with a lift capacity of 20,000 pounds.

In 1974 Smith became aware that the Johnson Flying Service was looking to sell its assets. The business was a small supplemental carrier that had two 94-passenger Lockheed L-188 Electra four-engine turbo-prop passenger aircraft.  More importantly, it held a supplemental air carrier operating certificate which allowed it to operate as an airline. After significant deliberation, the Civil Aeronautics Board approved the transfer in 1975.  Evergreen International Airlines was officially formed and incorporated on 16 April 1975 as a subsidiary of Evergreen Helicopters, Inc. The business subsequently continued to expand and split into a number of subsidiary divisions. The main subsidiary was Evergreen International Airlines which operated the Boeing 747 as a cargo or tanker aircraft to locations around the world. The 747-200 "Evergreen Supertanker" was capable of delivering 20,000 gallons of water on wildfires, nearly ten times what could be delivered by a conventional U.S. Forest Service firefighting air tanker such as the Lockheed P-3 Orion turboprop.

Scheduled passenger airline operations

The airline division conducted some scheduled passenger operations with Douglas DC-8 jet and Lockheed L-188 Electra turboprop aircraft with Detroit (DTW), Minneapolis/St. Paul (MSP), Seattle (SEA) and Spokane (GEG) being served in 1978.   The company also operated a commuter airline, Evergreen Airspur, in southern California with de Havilland Canada DHC-6 Twin Otter STOL turboprops in 1985.

U.S. government work
Evergreen was part of the US Civil Reserve Air Fleet and the International Peace Operations Association. It was known to do work for the United States federal government, including fire suppression for the U.S. Forest Service, troop transportation in the Gulf War of 1991, as well as helicopter transportation for oil rig firefighters at the end of hostilities.

CIA front
Evergreen served as a Central Intelligence Agency (CIA) front in numerous operations over its history:

Wherever there was a hot spot in the world, Evergreen’s helicopters and later airplanes were never far behind. Evergreen’s hardware was so inextricably linked with political intrigue that rumors swirled that the company was owned by, or a front for, the U.S. Central Intelligence Agency (CIA). Indeed, several of the company’s senior executives either worked for the agency or had close ties to it.

Smith never let on, disingenuously telling the Portland Oregonian in 1988, “We don't know when we’ve ever worked for them [the CIA], but if we did we’re proud of it. We believe in patriotism, and, you know, they're not the [Russian spy service] KGB.”

Evergreen bought assets during the 1970s that were previously linked to CIA operations, including Montana’s Johnson Flying Service and the CIA’s aviation "skunk works" at Pinal Airpark in Marana, Arizona, which under Evergreen did special aircraft modifications such as building the Boeing Dreamlifters (outsized 747s designed to transport Boeing 787 composite fuselage barrels) and servicing the NASA operated Boeing 747 Shuttle Carrier Aircraft (SCA) used to transport the Space Shuttle.  Evergreen subsequently sold the Pinal Airpark facility to Relativity Capital in 2011.

Officially, the company provided "aviation services" for the CIA, including transporting the Shah of Iran from Egypt to Panama, then Panama to the United States in 1980.

Sale of Evergreen Helicopters
Evergreen Helicopters was sold to Erickson Air-Crane in March 2013 for $250 million. The sale provided Evergreen International Aviation with the liquidity needed to continue operations. Smith said: "The sale of EHI provides us with needed capital to repay existing debt and gives us the liquidity to support our airline and remaining businesses."  The deal was contingent upon Erickson Air-Crane obtaining the necessary financing.

Demise
On 8 November 2013 Evergreen International Airlines, a subsidiary of Evergreen International Aviation, announced via a voicemail to their employees that all operations would cease effective 29 November 2013.

Evergreen’s airplanes and helicopters had once "supported United Nations peacekeeping operations in 30 countries, flew insect-eradication missions throughout Africa, were used for illegal-drug abatement spraying in Mexico and South America, helped build the Trans-Alaska oil pipeline and developed and serviced the offshore energy market worldwide. All told, Smith said his company flew in 168 countries over the years. 'We were all over the world. Everywhere they needed a helicopter, they needed an airplane as well,'" said Smith.

In June of 2014, Evergreen had declared Chapter 7 bankruptcy and began a liquidation of assets, including its headquarters campus in McMinnville.

By the time of Smith's death 7 November 2014, the remains of his once billion-dollar Evergreen Aviation empire had been sold off, shut down, or was in bankruptcy and under investigation by tax authorities.

Current fleet at the time of the end of aviation operations in 2013

Previous fixed wing aircraft

Evergreen also operated the following jet and turboprop aircraft at various times during its existence:

 Beechcraft King Air - including BE-90 King Air and BE-200C Super King Air aircraft
 Beechcraft 1900D
 Boeing B-17 - converted for use as a firefighting air tanker
 Boeing 727-100
 CASA 212
 de Havilland Canada DHC-6 Twin Otter
 Douglas DC-8 - including DC-8-52, Super DC-8-63 and Super DC-8-73F aircraft
 Douglas DC-9-15
 Gulfstream IV
 Learjet 35A
 Lockheed L-188 Electra
 Lockheed P-2 Neptune - converted for use as a firefighting air tanker
 McDonnell Douglas DC-9-30

Previous helicopter types

The helicopter division of Evergreen operated the following rotorcraft at various times during its existence:

Aerospatiale Alouette III - SA 316B models
Aerospatiale SA 315B Lama
Aerospatiale SA 330 Puma
AgustaWestland AW139
Bell 206 JetRanger - B206B-3 JetRanger III models
Bell 206 LongRanger - B206L-3 LongRanger III & B206L-4 LongRanger IV models
Bell 205
Bell 212
Bell 214ST
Bell 412EP
Eurocopter AS332 Super Puma - AS332L1 models
Eurocopter AS350 AStar - AS350B2 and AS350B3 models
Hiller UH-12E
Hughes 500D
MBB BO 105
Sikorsky S-61R
Sikorsky S-64 Skycrane
Sikorsky S-76C++
Sikorsky S-92

See also
Evergreen Aviation & Space Museum
Intermountain Airlines
Pinal Airpark
 List of defunct airlines of the United States

References

External links
Evergreen International Aviation
Evergreen's aerial super tanker

Companies based in Oregon
Airline holding companies of the United States
Private military contractors
McMinnville, Oregon
Privately held companies based in Oregon
1960 establishments in Oregon
2014 disestablishments in Oregon
Airlines disestablished in 2014
Airlines established in 1960
Companies that have filed for Chapter 7 bankruptcy
American companies established in 1960
American companies disestablished in 2014 
Holding companies established in 1960
Holding companies disestablished in 2014